Mohammad Choucair (1 August 1917 – 2 August 1987) was a Lebanese politician, who was assassinated on 2 August 1987.

Career
Choucair was a special advisor to the former Lebanese president Amine Gemayel. He actively participated in the negotiations of the 1987 peace agreement between Lebanon and Israel.

Death
Choucair was assassinated inside his home in the Syrian controlled part of West Beirut on 2 August 1987. The alleged perpetrators were Syrian agents.

See also
List of assassinated Lebanese people

References

20th-century Lebanese people
1917 births
1987 deaths
Assassinated Lebanese politicians
Kataeb Party politicians
Lebanese Maronites
American University of Beirut alumni